One Year Later is a 1933 American Pre-Code film directed by E. Mason Hopper.

Plot summary 
First, a pair of blissful honeymooners traveling by train. Then, a year later, the same coach is carrying the man to his place of execution. Although it seems hopeless, there are two wild cards on board: the man's wife and a terminally ill reporter.

Cast 
Mary Brian as Molly Collins
Russell Hopton as Tony Richards
Don Dillaway as Jim Collins
DeWitt Jennings as Deputy Russell
Will Ahern as Will Ahern
Gladys Ahern as Joyce Carewe
George Irving as J. Atwell Hunt
Jackie Searl as Clarence
Pauline Garon as Vera Marks
William Humphrey as Conductor
Harry Holman as Fat Man
Marjorie Beebe as News Stand Girl
Herbert Evans as The Englishman

Soundtrack

External links 

1933 films
American black-and-white films
1933 drama films
American drama films
Films directed by E. Mason Hopper
Films with screenplays by F. Hugh Herbert
1930s English-language films
1930s American films